Stuart Anthony Crudgington (born September 1948) is a British auto racing driver. He regularly competed in the British Touring Car Championship during the nineteen-eighties with cars from the Toyota marque. His most successful season came in 1988, finishing second in Class D and sixth overall. His final season in the BTCC was in 1989, finishing eighth overall and again runner-up in class D to Phil Dowsett. Crudgington still competes, mainly in historic events.

Racing record

Complete British Saloon / Touring Car Championship results
(key) (Races in bold indicate pole position) (Races in italics indicate fastest lap – 1 point awarded ?–1989 in class)

References

External links

Living people
British Touring Car Championship drivers
1948 births